

Medal table

Men's events

Women's events

Events at the 1999 Pan American Games
1999
1999 in canoeing